Capnobotes is a North-American genus of shield-backed katydids in the family Tettigoniidae. There are about 9 described species in Capnobotes.

Species
 Capnobotes arizonensis (Rehn, 1904) (Arizona longwing)
 Capnobotes attenuatus Rentz & Birchim, 1968 (slender longwing)
 Capnobotes bruneri Scudder, 1897 (Bruner longwing)
 Capnobotes fuliginosus (Thomas, 1872) (sooty longwing)
 Capnobotes granti Rentz & Birchim, 1968 (Grant longwing)
 Capnobotes imperfectus Rehn, 1901
 Capnobotes occidentalis (Thomas, 1872) (western longwing)
 Capnobotes spatulatus Rentz & Birchim, 1968 (spatulate longwing)
 Capnobotes unodontus Rentz & Birchim, 1968 (one-tooth longwing)

References

 Capinera J.L, Scott R.D., Walker T.J. (2004). Field Guide to Grasshoppers, Katydids, and Crickets of the United States. Cornell University Press.
 Otte, Daniel (1997). "Tettigonioidea". Orthoptera Species File 7, 373.

Further reading

 Arnett, Ross H. (2000). American Insects: A Handbook of the Insects of America North of Mexico. CRC Press.

Tettigoniinae